Porvoo Cathedral is a cathedral of the Evangelical Lutheran Church of Finland in Porvoo, Finland. It was built in the 15th century, although the oldest parts date from the 13th century. It is the seat of the Diocese of Borgå, Finland's Swedish-speaking diocese (Borgå is the Swedish language form of Porvoo). The cathedral is also used for services by the Porvoo Finnish-speaking parish, which is administratively part of the Diocese of Helsinki. The church first became a cathedral in 1723, when the diocese of Viipuri (Viborg) (now the Diocese of Tampere) moved to Porvoo, after Vyborg was ceded to Russia in the Treaty of Nystad.

History
The church was originally made of wood. The first stone walls were built between 1410 and 1420, and in about 1450, the church was expanded  towards the east and  towards the south.

The church has been destroyed by fire numerous times; in 1508 by Danish forces and in 1571, 1590 and 1708 by Russian forces. On May 29, 2006, the outer roof collapsed in a fire, but with the inner ceiling undamaged and the cathedral interiors intact. An 18-year-old man was convicted of arson and sentenced to six and a half years in prison. The cathedral was reopened on 2 July 2008.

The cathedral was the site of the opening of the first Diet of Finland on 28 March 1809, at which Finland was declared an autonomous Grand Duchy, with the Emperor of Russia (Czar / Tsar) as the Grand Duke of Finland.

The cathedral hosted the joint celebration Eucharist to mark the signing of a formal agreement between the British and Irish Anglican churches and the Nordic (Scandinavian) and Baltic Lutheran churches (completed in 1992), which took its name from Porvoo as the Porvoo Common Statement theological agreement, forming the Porvoo Communion was adopted.

References

External links

Cathedral website (in Finnish and Swedish)

Lutheran cathedrals in Finland
Buildings and structures in Porvoo
Gothic architecture in Finland
Tourist attractions in Uusimaa
Arson in Finland
Churches destroyed by arson
Medieval stone churches in Finland
Lutheran churches converted from Roman Catholicism